Matteo Matteazzi (born 25 April 1971 in Chiavari) is a retired Italian footballer. He played as defender.
He played in Entella youth teams from 1981 to 1988 and then in Genoa primavera from 1988 to 1991. After that he became a professional footballer and played for many Serie C1 and Serie C2 teams. He played also in Serie B for Empoli.

His last team was the Lavagnese team for which he served as captain.

Career
1987-1988  Entella 7 (0)
1988-1991  Genoa 0 (0)
1991       Pro Vasto 5 (0)
1991-1994  Montevarchi 85 (1)
1994-2000  Carrarese 120 (6)
2000       Empoli 5 (0)
2001-2003  Lucchese 84 (4)
2003-2008  Lavagnese  ? (?)

References
 

1971 births
Living people
Italian footballers

Association football defenders